Heinrich Rosenthal ( – 10 May 1916) was an activist of the Estonian national movement, doctor and author.

Rosenthal was born in Tartu.  He was a founder of the Estonian Students' Society in 1870 while a student at the University of Tartu. Later he helped to found corporation Fraternitas Estica in 1907.

He wrote the book Kulturbestrebungen des estnischen Volkes während eines Menschenalters (1869-1900) (The cultural aspirations of the Estonian people during one generation (1869-1900)) (Reval: Cordes & Schenk, 1912).  He died in Tallinn, aged 69.

Bibliography
"Eesti rahva kultuuripüüdlused ühe inimpõlve vältel: mälestusi aastatest 1869-1900", tõlkinud Krista Räni; saatesõna ja kommentaarid kirjutanud Mart Laar, Tartu, 2004.
"Kulturbestrebungen des estnischen Volkes während eines Menschenalters (1869-1900)", Tallinn, 1912.

References

1846 births
1916 deaths
Estonian non-fiction writers
19th-century Estonian writers 
20th-century Estonian writers 
University of Tartu alumni
Writers from Tartu
People from Tartu